The Honda CT series was a group of Honda trail bike motorcycles made since 1964. The CT designation is a slight exception in Honda nomenclature in that "CT" does not indicate a series of mechanically related bikes, but rather a group of different bikes that are all for casual off-road use.

Overview
A description of the CT-series is necessarily convoluted because it spans several decades during which Honda altered its naming system, re-used previously issued CT designations, assigned different model names for different markets, and sometimes used multiple names for the same model within single markets.  The most commonly-used nomenclature is the name "Trail" being followed by the engine displacement class; thus, several different models bore the "Trail 90" designation, over a 20-year period (making this, collectively, the most popular series). Not surprisingly, the assumption is often made that any of the full-sized CT series is a "Trail 90" when first observed.

The CT designation has been used for the Trail Cub series of bikes since 1964. Alongside, a ST-series bike was renamed CT70 for the Canadian and US market from 1969 to 1994 (to further confuse the issue, both the CT70 and Z50 series were dubbed "Mini Trail," again followed by the displacement class). Honda also uses the CT designation to cover an Australia-only series of "farm bikes" for agricultural work. In 1981 Honda released a CT250S Silk Road "trekking bike", and in 1983 a Japan-only CT50 Motra minibike. These last two vehicles are mechanically unrelated to other CT-series bikes, and each other.

Trail Cub/Hunter Cub

The Trail Cub series is an offshoot of the popular Super Cub line, and the bikes are known by several names. In Japan they were introduced as the Hunter Cub, while in the Canada/US market they were called the Trail Cub or just "Trail" followed by a number indicating engine size, such as "Trail 90". Individual models may also be known by model number, such as CT90 and CT110. In Australia the CT110 has acquired the popular moniker "Postie Bike" due to its long association with the Australia Post.

These small 17" wheel bikes are intended for relatively slow off-road travel. They have 4-stroke engines ranging from 49 cc to 105 cc, and automatic clutches. All bikes have either 3- or 4-speed transmissions, plus a second choice of HIGH or LOW bands to apply the same gears to road travel or slower off-road travel. The early bikes achieved this by having two drive sprockets at the rear wheel, which required the rider to dismount and thread the chain onto the desired sprocket. Later bikes placed the two-stage choice within the gearbox, and required the rider to only move a lever.

1960–1962 C100H/C100T/CA100T "Trail 50"

The initial model numbers are Super Cub numbers with the suffix H for Hunter, or T for Trail. These bikes are technically not CT-series bikes, but C- and CA- series variants. However, Honda would give the new Trail Cub line its own CT designation by 1964, so any overview of the CT-series should include these first models for clarity.

There is no CA100H because CA100 designated an America-only export Super Cub, hence H for Hunter version would not apply.

These first bikes exhibit the chief characteristics of the Trail Cub line. The Super Cub's plastic engine cover and leg shield were removed, exposing the long single tube joining the rear pressed-steel frame with the forks. The bikes have knobby tires, and the Super Cub's large front fender was replaced with a smaller unit to better clear mud. The Trail Cub has a single saddle followed by a large chrome equipment rack, on which a second saddle can be installed. There is also a skid plate to prevent damage to the low-slung engine. As with all Cubs, the fuel tank is within the seat pedestal.

These bikes also introduce characteristics that would only be typical of the first few Trail Cub models. The forks are Super Cub style, being a pressed steel unit with small leading-link springs. The long exhaust pipe sweeps straight back horizontal near the ground, unlike the upswept exhaust that would become characteristic of later bikes. The stepped chainrings are also quite evident, as the larger off-road ring is nearly twice the diameter of the road ring.  This large sprocket also required the left rear shock absorber to be repositioned outboard of the swingarm, on an extended top mount, the right side remaining in its normal C100 position inboard of the swingarm.

1962–1965 C105H/C105T/CA105T "Trail 55"

The "105" bikes are largely identical to their "100" predecessor. The rear shock mounts are made further apart to place both outboard of the swingarm (the C100T had only the left side outboard to clear the large sprocket).   There is a slight increase in engine size from 49 cc to 54 cc, and 1963 sees the introduction the distinctive upswept exhaust with large chrome heat-shield.

1964–1966 CT200 "Trail 90"

The 1964 CT200 is technically the first "CT-series" Honda.

This bike represents a relatively large increase in engine size from 54 cc to 87 cc, and the introduction of a 4-speed transmission. This bike also introduced adjustable steel-tube handlebars, rather than the fixed, pressed-steel covered, Super Cub style bars of previous bikes.  It was a bigger heavier bike,  the frame and engine being based on the CM90, rather than the C100.-

1966–1979 CT90 "Trail 90"

The CT90 begins the now-familiar Honda nomenclature of prefix letters indicating bike family, followed by numbers indicating engine size.   The 87cc OHV engine is replaced by an 89cc alloy-head OHC unit,  which is basically a 4-speed version of that used in the CM91 Super Cub.

This model sees two important improvements to the series. In 1968 the stepped-chainring is replaced with a convenient secondary gearbox that only requires a turn of a small lever placed near the rider's left heel. In 1969 the Super Cub style leading-link fork is replaced with a modern telescopic fork of greatly increased travel.

This Trail Cub would become one of the most popular models, staying in production for 13 years.

1968 CT50 Hunter Cub

In 1968 Honda announced a new CT50 Hunter Cub for the home market. This light-weight bike featured the new dual-range gearbox, coupled with a 3-speed transmission. It retained the Super Cub style leading-link fork.

1980-2008 CT110 "Trail 110"

The CT110 is the final model of the Trail Cub line. It is largely identical to the CT90 except for an increase in engine size from 89.5 cc to 105 cc. Very late model CT110 have a completely enclosed chainguard like a Super Cub.

The bike was last sold in the US in 1986. Honda lists domestic production from 1981 to 2000.

The CT110 has a long association with the Australia Post as a mail carrier vehicle, leading to the popular moniker "Postie Bike". Australia Post was still receiving hundreds of new CT110 as late as 2010.

CT50 Motra

The CT50 Motra is a minibike produced in 1982–1983 for the Japanese domestic market. It has a boxy rugged appearance, with an angular steel-tube and panel frame supporting large racks fore and aft. This utility/military style is emphasized by a lack of decorative chrome, and by a solid yellow or green paint scheme for all bodywork and wheels.

It is unrelated to the Trail Cub series and should not be confused with the 1968 CT50 Hunter Cub.

CT70 "Trail 70"

The Honda ST70 Dax was sold in Canada and the US as the CT70 "Trail 70" from 1969 to 1982, and reintroduced in 1991 until 1994 . It is a minibike distinguished by a pressed-steel "T-bone" frame, and equipped with folding handle-bars.

The slightly larger ST90 Dax was sold in the US as the Trailsport, but was not given a CT-series designation. This was probably to avoid confusion with the concurrent Trail Cub CT90 "Trail 90".

CT125/CT185/CT200 Farm Bikes

Honda has built a series of Australia-only CT bikes for agricultural work. As a general description these are variants of Honda dirt bikes, equipped with larger saddles, a fully enclosed chainguard, and front and rear racks.

The last model of CT110 Trail Cub (described above) is also marketed as a Farm Bike in Australia. It is not mechanically related to these bikes.

CT125 "Trail 125"
The 1975–1985 Honda CT125 is a 125cc fourstroke motorbike which was designed for farm use. The bike is actually an XL125 with a more 'comfortable' seat. The CT125, which takes its engine from the TL125 with different gear ratios, also has lower gearing than the XL125.  The first two gears are spaced very close together for low speed operation.  The CT also came with a chrome rear rack, a steel handlebar and lever protector, engine guard, sidestand guard, a smaller 19" front wheel (XL125 had a 21"), and a unique enclosed chainguard that completely covers the drive chain. The seat is also shorter and the bike is only designed to carry one person, not two.  Also specific to the CT125 are the large mudflaps front and rear.  The frame is painted Shiny Orange as is the tank and sidecovers.  The XL had a black frame.  The CT125 also has a welded on bash plate on the bottom of the frame.

The CT125 was also exported to the USA and Canada for 1977 only.

CT250S Silk Road

The 1981 CT250S Silk Road was Honda's attempt at a "trekking" motorcycle, marketed between its mechanical siblings, the CB250RS road bike and the XL250 dirt bike.  It has slightly more ground clearance than the CB250RS, and an upswept and close-fitted chrome exhaust that is kept clear of both debris and luggage. The Silk Road was offered with a single saddle followed by a chrome baggage rack.  A removable pillion seat can be fitted to this rack. Its 6-speed transmission is geared as a regular 5-speed plus one extra-low gear.

2020 CT125

In 2019 Honda Announced they would be bringing back the Iconic design of the CT110 with a model dubbed the CT125 (Not to be confused with the farm bike of the same name). It was released in Australia in 2020 and America in 2021. The vehicle is equipped with several modern features such as an LED Instrument cluster, Led Headlights and Front Wheel ABS.

See also
 Honda Super Cub

References

 1962 Honda CA100T Trail 50 infobox specifications from these pages on 2008-03-01: 
 http://www.hondamuseum.com/hallOfFame.asp?pg=specs&bike=DCA100&name=1962%20CA100T%20Trail%2050
 1963 Honda C105H Hunter Cub infobox specifications from these pages on 2008-03-01: 
 https://web.archive.org/web/20090524040850/http://www.honda.co.jp/collection-hall/2r/220.html
 1964 Honda CT200 Hunter Cub infobox specifications from these pages on 2008-03-01: 
 http://www.honda.co.jp/sou50/Hworld/Hall/2r/87.html
 https://web.archive.org/web/20070822132706/http://www.honda.co.jp/collection-hall/event/week/05_6/index.html
 1965 Honda CT200 Trail 90 infobox specifications from these pages on 2008-03-01: 
 http://www.hondamuseum.com/hallOfFame.asp?pg=specs&bike=BCT200&name=1965%20CT200%20Trail%2090
 1968 Honda CT50 Hunter Cub infobox specifications from these pages on 2008-03-01: 
 https://web.archive.org/web/20070822201913/http://www.honda.co.jp/collection-hall/event/week/05_10/index.html
 1981 Honda CT110 Hunter Cub infobox specifications from these pages on 2008-03-01: 
 http://www.honda.co.jp/news/1981/2811001.html
 1984 CT200 infobox specifications from these pages on 2008-03-01: 
 https://web.archive.org/web/20090524183930/http://www.honda.co.jp/collection-hall/2r/ct200_1985.html
 https://web.archive.org/web/20080517184724/http://www.geocities.co.jp/MotorCity-Circuit/7509/sub9-10.htm
 1981 CT250S Silk Road infobox specifications from these pages on 2008-03-01: 
 http://www.honda.co.jp/news/1981/2810313.html
 http://www.honda.co.jp/factbook/motor/VT250/19820500/019.html

External links 
 

Dual-sport motorcycles
CT series
Motorcycles introduced in 1964